Marie Ryan may refer to:

Marie Ryan (camogie), played in 1978 All-Ireland Senior Camogie Championship
Marie-Laure Ryan, writer

See also
Mary Ryan (disambiguation)